Queen Elizabeth's School, Barnet is a boys' grammar school in Barnet, northern Greater London, which was founded in 1573 by Robert Dudley, 1st Earl of Leicester, and others, in the name of Queen Elizabeth I.

It is consistently ranked as one of the most academically successful secondary schools in England, having topped A Level league tables for grammar schools for five consecutive years, as of 2016, and was chosen by the Sunday Times as "State School of the Year" in 2007. An Ofsted report published in January 2008 stated: "It is held in very high regard by the vast majority of students and their parents, and rightly so." It has also been a Training school since April 2009 and has a specialism in Music.

History

Foundation and location 
The school was founded in 1573 by Queen Elizabeth I, petitioned by Robert Dudley, Earl of Leicester, and assisted by local alderman Edward Underne. Elizabeth I's charter of 1573 describes the school's purpose thus:

 Bringing up and instruction of boys and youth, to be brought up in grammar and other learning, and the same to continue for ever, and the said School for one Master and one Usher for ever to continue and remain and that there shall be for ever four-and-twenty discreet, honest governors 

The original Tudor building, known as Tudor Hall, was erected in 1577 opposite the Church of St John the Baptist on Wood Street, with money raised by the first governors of the school and by collections in London churches. It was repaired in 1597 and again in 1637. During the 17th century, further extensive repairs were carried out, in spite of a poor financial situation following the Civil War. Financial conditions became progressively more comfortable during the 18th century.

The trustees of Elizabeth Allen's Charity, which had been established by her will dated 10 February 1725, gave financial assistance to save it from a state "very ruinous and unfit for habitation". It then became a private boarding school. It was closed in 1872 and restored in 1874 with many additions. In 1885 a governor, H. E. Chetwynd Stapleton, bought a plot of land behind the Jesus Hospital, a building in Wood Street dating back to 1679; today the Stapylton field stands in front of the main School building and is used for rugby and cricket. As the number of pupils outgrew the capacity of Tudor Hall, so the school was transferred in 1932 to a new site in Queen's Road, which backed on to the Stapylton field. It was administered by the South Herts Division of Hertfordshire County Council, until 1965 when it became part of the borough of Barnet. In the 1960s, there were around 550 boys with 150 in the sixth form. Tudor Hall was completely restored in 1968 by the London Borough of Barnet, and is now part of Barnet and Southgate College.
Two plaques are located on the walls of the original school building, Tudor Hall. Inscribed on the stone plaque is: This is to commemorate the original school founded here by Queen Elizabeth and built in 1573. The school was removed in 1932 to new building in Queens Road, Barnet. This plaque was erected by the Visitors of Jesus Hospital Charity, the owners in 1952. A more recent blue plaque was erected by the London borough of Barnet which dictates:  This Tudor Hall housed the free grammar school of Queen Elizabeth I who granted its charter in 1573.

Grammar school reinstatement
Under Eamonn Harris (Headmaster 1984 - 1999), who took over the school when earmarked for closure, it returned to its previous selective grammar school status in August 1994, having opted out of the London borough and become a grant-maintained school in 1989. Other schools in Greater London did this, and many became partially selective (up to 50%) at this time. In the 1990s it went on to become England's top state school for A Levels.

The girls' school remained a comprehensive.

From 1999 to 2011, the headmaster was Dr John Marincowitz, who commissioned the new Martin swimming pool, opened in 2006, the Shearly Hall, opened in 2009, and a library. In 2011 Neil Enright became the 40th headmaster, and the completion and use of the Queen's library took place.

QE has been criticized by many current and former pupils for a very strict approach to discipline. In April 2000, this led a group of current and former pupils to create a website where they could talk about their experiences. This was known as 'QE Boys: The Truth'. It gained more hits than the official website, and the school excluded three pupils for posting messages on it. However, the current system uses 'bad notes' sent directly to parents via e-mail if a pupil repeatedly shows poor behaviour or organization. If too many accumulate, the issue is referred to the pupil's tutor and then to their year head.

Culture and sports
Queen Elizabeth's School is divided into six houses, named after famous old boys, patrons and former teachers. They are Broughton, Harrisons', Leicester, Pearce, Stapylton and Underne. In years 7 to 10, there are six tutor groups per year, one per house. They are named by the academic year and the first letter of the house, for example year 10 students in Underne belong to the tutor group 10U. Students stay in the same tutor groups as they progress during these four years. In year 11, each tutor group is split into two, and the number 1 or 2 is added to the tutor group name. For example, 10U is split into 11U1 and 11U2. In years 12 and 13, the tutor groups are much smaller and run alphabetically instead. One year takes letters A-J and the other K-T, and the letter stays the same for both years e.g. 12I becomes 13I the next year.

There are many inter-house competitions, from rugby to creative writing. The inter-house debating tournaments, for years 7 to 9, take place in English lessons in the Spring term and are probably the most fiercely contested non-physical inter-house competition.

Rugby union, played during the winter and spring terms, is compulsory for boys in their first four years at the school, as are cross country running and most other school sports, which include orienteering, swimming, basketball, tennis, cricket, Eton fives and athletics. QE is well known for not playing football competitively against other schools, although it is occasionally played internally in friendly games and at lunchtimes. Students also take part in cross country runs semi-annually, at the start of the autumn and spring terms. A particularly muddy part of the cross-country route, suitably nicknamed the 'Elephant Dip', owing to its extreme depth in wet weather, links the Byng Road Open Space (Barnet RFC) and the north-west gate of the bottom fields, however there is also a paved route turning right from the gate and going down Byng Road towards the Open Space. Students regularly use the Barnet RFC's fields (the Byng Road Open Space) which are a short run from the back field gate.

There is much competition in the summer term when frequent competitions between houses are held before the summer examinations begin in June, including the QE Sevens Tournament which takes place in the school for the U14s and U16s. It is normally held at the end of the Spring Term.

A level and Essential Skills assessments
Boys usually choose four subjects which will be studied for AS, but may drop one for A Level, either voluntarily, or because it does not appear that they can continue with outstanding performance in the subject. These subjects can, liable to some controversy, only be chosen after receiving offers of study, commonly referred to as 'recommendations', in those particular subjects. Given the large number of students who achieve many, sometimes straight, grades 8 or 9 at GCSE, achieving an outstanding grade in a given subject at GCSE level is not sufficient to judge suitability for A Level. Instead, students must show that they have the 'essential skills' required to thrive at A Level in the subjects. Once departments are confident that a student possesses the required 'essential skills', only then will they issue a recommendation. To judge this, criteria are set by each department which must be met either in regular end-of-topic tests during the GCSE course, or by 'Essential Skills' tests which are sat exclusively to measure performance against these criteria. A minority of recommendations are issued to those who have met the criteria in November of year 11, but most will have an opportunity to meet further criteria in further tests, often including the GCSE mock exams, to then get a recommendation in February. Around 2/3 of all recommendations are given in February as opposed to November.

One of the main focuses of sixth form is preparation for entry into higher education. As a result, the school focuses on career advice, the UCAS application process, personal statements, finance and other things related to university entry, which are often covered in PSHE lessons (known internally as Personal Development time or PDT) which take place in tutor groups once a week, as with lower years. The school also encourages that students partake in a wide range of extracurricular activities both outside of and during school time, such as the recommended 30 hours of volunteering.

Founder's Day fête
The Founder's Day fête, and the preceding service of celebration at St John the Baptist's Church, Barnet, is the largest cultural event in the school calendar. It is held every year, regardless of weather, on the third Saturday in June, and celebrates the founding of the school in 1573.

All Year 7 students must attend the service in full uniform. The governors also attend, as do most teachers, in academic dress with gowns. Teachers wearing gowns with white fur went to Cambridge University. The head boys, past and present, are readers at the service, and the School Choir and Chamber Choir sing. The hymns sung are: "All people that on earth do dwell", "For all the saints", "Jerusalem" and "Now thank we all our God". "God Save the Queen" is always sung at the end of the service. The boys then walk back to the school along Wood Street and prepare for the roll call on Stapylton Field. This is again compulsory for all of Year 7, with five boys from each house attending from all other senior years. In the past, this was compulsory for the whole school. The boys troop in from the two wings of the main building and form three lines stretching across the Stapylton Field. The boys of each house sit together, although traditionally they had to stand. 

The School Chronicle is read out each year at Founder's Day by the Headmaster during the Roll Call, with minor additions as necessary. It was originally prepared in 1930 by Ernest H. Jenkins, the headmaster, Cecil Tripp, Secretary of the Old Elizabethan Association and a Governor of the school for twenty-four years. The most up to date school chronicle is listed on the school website and was read out during the Roll Call at Founder's Day 2017.

In 2020, most boys were not in school due to the coronavirus pandemic, so the Roll Call was recorded with Zoom and only year 7 boys attended. The fête, as well as a biryani cook-along, was published as a 45-minute video on YouTube.

Kerala partnership
QE Boys has formed a long-term partnership with a school in Kerala called the Sri Sathya Sai School, funded by the 'Sathya Sai Appeal'. In addition, the school has strong links with charities through the house system, and three events are held each academic year (two houses join forces for each event) to generate funds for a charity elected by students and staff. These range from guessing teachers’ childhood pictures to general knowledge quizzes.

Traditions
 The name of every head boy of the school is written on two boards in the school's main hall. 
 Each house has its own colour, represented by coloured stripes for the corresponding house on ties. The colours used to be on the boys' caps, but these are no longer worn. Red denotes Broughton, brown for Harrisons', yellow for Leicester, purple for Pearce, blue for Stapylton and green for Underne.
 In the Lower School, subjects which aren't divided into ability based sets are set either in tutor groups (see above), or in two halves of the year – Broughton, Harrisons' and Leicester (BHL), and Pearce, Stapylton and Underne (PSU).
 Different 'colours' ties are used to denote achievement or position, e.g. school prefects can be identified with their ties which are patterned with thick light-blue stripes, with the addition of a School logo for senior prefects.

House system
The foundation and naming of the six houses is listed below: 
Broughton — Named in memory of William Grant Broughton, an Old Elizabethan, who was appointed Archdeacon of New South Wales in 1828 and subsequently became the first Bishop of Australia.
Harrisons' — The only House to honour two people, Harrisons' was established in 1954. It was named after a senior master, G. W. N. Harrison, who had taught at the school for 41 years until 1929, and E. W. Harrison (no relation), another long-serving and dedicated schoolmaster who retired in 1950.
Leicester — A continuing reminder of the School's beginnings: Robert Dudley, Earl of Leicester made the request to Queen Elizabeth for a charter for the School in 1573.
Pearce — John Pearce began his teaching career at the School in 1932, aged 23. In 1950 he became Senior Master, a post he held until he retired in 1971. The sixth House was named after him on its creation in 1971 when the School became comprehensive and expanded.
Stapylton — Named after former Chairman of Governors H. E. Chetwynd-Stapylton, who in 1885 bought the Stapylton field for the school, which is still very much in use today.
Underne — Once Queen Elizabeth had granted the Charter for the school, funds were needed to finance it. Edward Underne, Rector of Chipping Barnet Church, was responsible for raising the money for the original building of the School in the 1570s.

Academic excellence
In 2007, QE came first in the A-Level league table for state schools, and twelfth in the GCSE league table for state schools. In 2008 QE again topped the league table in A-level results and a record number of 37 pupils gained a place in Oxbridge Universities.

In January 2014, it was announced that Barrie Martin, Chairman of the QE Governing Body and the Friends of Queen Elizabeth's was awarded an MBE for 'Services to Education'.  Headmaster Neil Enright described Martin as: 'an asset to QE in so many ways, combining a tireless work ethic with tremendous focus and an utterly reliable good nature'.

In 2016, QE came first in the A-Level league tables for selective state (grammar) schools for the 5th year in a row, also coming sixth in the GCSE league tables for grammar schools. 2016 would make the eighth year, in the past decade, that the school have achieved the top spot in the A Level league tables, solidifying their position at the forefront of the modern British educational scene.

Notable alumni 

 Allastair McReady-Diarmid, Victoria Cross recipient in World War I
Jay Shetty, internet personality and lifestyle blogger. 
 Lucian Grainge, Chairman and Chief Executive since 2005 of Universal Music Group International, and of Universal Music UK from 2001–5
 Tim Bell, advisor to Margaret Thatcher
 Kelvin Hopkins, Labour Member of Parliament (MP) for Luton North since 1997
 Duncan Maskell, Vice Chancellor, University of Melbourne
 Cameron McVey, singer/songwriter/record producer, married to Neneh Cherry
 George Mpanga, stage name George the Poet, a London-born spoken word performer of Ugandan heritage
 Wilfred De'Ath, writer and broadcaster
 Edward Blishen, writer
 Darren Foreman, better known as 'Beardyman', UK beatboxing champion
 Robert Rinder, barrister best known for his role on the courtroom series Judge Rinder
 Jay Foreman, comedian and song writer chiefly known for his YouTube channel.
 Peter Wells, Olympic, Empire and Commonwealth Games high jumper representing Great Britain, England and New Zealand between 1950 and 1956

During the Second World War the athletics coach Franz Stampfl taught physical education at the school until his internment in 1940 as an enemy alien. The future headmaster of Eton, John Lewis, briefly taught Latin in the early 1970s.

Other Information

Admissions procedure
Admission to the school is strictly by academic selection, and boys may apply to join the school for Year 7. Most years, roughly 3,600 applicants compete in a series of examinations to be awarded one of the 180 places offered annually, making places at the grammar school some of the most sought after and oversubscribed in the country.

Parents of boys not admitted to the school have protested and appealed against the school's selective admissions policy. Sometimes this has been because the prospective boy's parents have moved to the area assuming a place will be guaranteed, when this is not the case. The school was also on a list of schools breaching admissions laws in England. The Barnet education authority asked for an investigation by Her Majesty's Inspectorate.

Contribution requests 
In 2014 it was reported that the school, despite not being of independent school status, was making regular forcible requests to parents for 'voluntary donations' in order to provide the facilities pupils needed, with parents contributing monthly, usually around £60. The school justified these requests by saying that state funding was not sufficient to provide a sound education and "the polish for boys to go on to the best universities".

References

External links 

 
 Old Elizabethans
 EduBase

News items 
 Telegraph August 2009
 Observer May 1999

Boys' schools in London
1573 establishments in England
Educational institutions established in the 1570s
Academies in the London Borough of Barnet
Grammar schools in the London Borough of Barnet
Training schools in England
Chipping Barnet